Eichsfeldia (minor planet designation: 442 Eichsfeldia) is a large main belt asteroid that was discovered by German astronomers Max Wolf and A. Schwassmann on 15 February 1899 in Heidelberg. It is classified as a C-type asteroid and is probably composed of primitive carbonaceous material.

Although Eichsfeldia has an orbit similar to the Vesta family asteroids, it was found to be an unrelated interloper on the basis of its non-matching spectral type.

References

External links 
 Lightcurve plot of (442) Eichsfeldia, Antelope Hills Observatory
 
 

000442
Discoveries by Max Wolf
Discoveries by Friedrich Karl Arnold Schwassmann
Named minor planets
000442
000442
18990215